Product Sans is a contemporary geometric sans-serif typeface created by Google for branding purposes. It replaced the old Google logo on September 1, 2015. As Google's branding was becoming more apparent on a multitude of kinds of devices, Google sought to adapt its design so that its logo could be portrayed in constrained spaces and remain consistent for its users across platforms.

Design 
The design team wanted to retain the simple and approachable styles in previous logos but also include geometric forms. The font nearly matches the Futura typeface. The most notable difference between the two is the double-storey 'a', which was implemented to contrast the circular shapes of the other characters. Product Sans prefers to end the stroke terminals at about 45 degrees, with the cut off being perpendicular to the tangent of the stroke.

Slight optical corrections were also made to the geometric forms. The uppercase "G" has its circular shape pulled inwards slightly where it meets the crossbar. The counters of the '6', '8', and '9' are almost perfect circles. These visual corrections were made for legibility.

License 
The Product Sans font has not been released as an open source font.

Usage 

The present Google logo is based on Product Sans. Slight modifications do exist in the logo compared to the typeface: the most noticeable is the slanted 'e'. The differences between the logo and Product Sans allows for distinction between the Google logotype and product name. Product Sans is mainly used in the text of Google's numerous services' logotypes such as Maps, Drive, News, Earth, etc. The font is also used on the Google Store, and in some versions of Android.

Variations 
In 2018, Google created Google Sans, a size-optimized version of Product Sans used as the display font of Google's customized and adapted version of Material Design, the "Google Material Theme".

Sometime between 2018 and 2020, Google also created Google Sans Display, a variation of Google Sans.

In 2020, Google introduced Google Sans Text, yet another variation of Google Sans featured in some used products, with the most notable difference being the added spur on the capital letter "G".

See also 
 Cantarell
 IBM Plex
 Roboto
 Noto
 Segoe
 San Francisco

References

External links 
 Product Sans Specimen by Google
 Product Sans Demo (All Weights and Sizes)

Geometric sans-serif typefaces
Corporate typefaces
Display typefaces
Google